Kenneth Myers (August 10, 1896 – September 22, 1972) was an American rower who competed in the 1920 Summer Olympics, in the 1928 Summer Olympics, and in the 1932 Summer Olympics.

In 1920, he was part of the American boat, which won the silver medal in the coxed fours event. Eight years later, he won his second silver medal, this time in the single sculls competition. In 1932, he won the gold medal with his partner William Gilmore in the double sculls event.

References

External links
 profile

1896 births
1972 deaths
American male rowers
Rowers at the 1920 Summer Olympics
Rowers at the 1928 Summer Olympics
Rowers at the 1932 Summer Olympics
Olympic gold medalists for the United States in rowing
Olympic silver medalists for the United States in rowing
Medalists at the 1932 Summer Olympics
Medalists at the 1928 Summer Olympics
Medalists at the 1920 Summer Olympics